Fred Mandir Jachan Omach, commonly known as Fred Omach is a Ugandan banker and politician. He is the current Chairman of the board of directors at Uganda National Roads Authority, since 14 March 2017.

He previously served as State Minister for Finance (General Duties) in the Ugandan Cabinet. He was appointed to this position in 2006. In the cabinet reshuffle of 16 February 2009, and that of 27 May 2011, he retained his cabinet post.

He also served as the elected Member of Parliament (MP), for "Jonam County", Nebbi District from 2001 until 2016.

Background and education
He was born in Nebbi District on 16 April 1953. Fred Omach attended St. Aloysius College Nyapea, in present-day Zombo District, for his O-Level studies. He then attended Lango College in Lira for his A-Level studies, graduating in 1973. He entered Makerere University, the oldest university in East Africa in 1974, graduating in 1977 with the degree of Bachelor of Arts degree in Economics and Social Administration.

Career
After graduating from Makerere University, he was hired as a Personnel Officer, by the  Uganda Ministry of Public Service, in 1978. In 1979 he joined the now defunct Uganda Commercial Bank (UCB), the largest commercial bank in Uganda at that time. He rose through the ranks until he attained the rank of General Manager, at UCB.

He retired from banking and entered elective politics in 2001. That year, Omach successfully contested for the parliamentary seat of "Jonam County", Nebbi District. He was re-elected continuously since then, until he lost the seat in 2016.

In March 2017, he was appointed chairman of the seven-person board of directors at UNRA, the national roads authority in Uganda. His term runs until March 2020.

Personal details
Fred Omach is married. He has particular interest in Bible study, playing golf and reading.

See also
 Parliament of Uganda
 Stanbic Bank Uganda

References

External links
Website of the Parliament of Uganda
Full Ministerial Cabinet List, May 2011

1953 births
Living people
Alur people
People from Nebbi District
Makerere University alumni
Ugandan bankers
Members of the Parliament of Uganda
Government ministers of Uganda
People from West Nile sub-region
21st-century Ugandan politicians